Vice admiral John Cheshire Daniel (1 November 189923 November 1992) was a United States Navy officer who served in World War II and the Korean War.

Early life
He was born in Philadelphia in 1899.

Career
He graduated from the United States Naval Academy in 1924.

On 20 March 1943 he took command of the destroyer  on its commissioning. He commanded Ammen during the landings on Attu and subsequent operations in the Aleutian Islands.

In mid-May 1943 he was appointed commander of the newly formed Operational Naval Demolition Unit and Naval Combat Demolition Unit No. 1 at the Amphibious Training Base, Solomons, Maryland. On 14 May 1943 six officers and 18 enlisted men reported for training from the Seabee training camp at Camp Peary, Virginia. After a four-week course they were sent to participate in Operation Husky, the Allied invasion of Sicily.

He was aboard  when the Japanese surrender was signed.

On 14 May 1949 he took command of the cruiser  on its commissioning.

On 22 June 1952 Daniel joined the United Nations Command ceasefire delegation at Panmunjom replacing Admiral Ruthven E. Libby. On 12 December 1952 he assumed command of COMSTSWESTPACAREA, succeeding Rear Admiral W.F. Paterson. On 6 April 1953 he led the negotiations for the exchange of sick and wounded prisoners that culminated in Operation Little Switch which took place from 20 April to 3 May 1953. He continued to be involved in the ceasefire negotiations leading the signing of the Korean Armistice Agreement on 27 July 1953.

He served as commandant of the 6th Naval District from 28 February 1958 until 30 September 1959.

He retired from the Navy in 1960.

Later life and death
After moving to Fort Lauderdale, Florida after his military retirement, he died on 23 November 1992 at North Beach Hospital there from pneumonia and heart problems. He was buried at Arlington National Cemetery on 30 November 1992.

References

1899 births
1992 deaths
United States Naval Academy alumni
Military personnel from Philadelphia
United States Navy personnel of World War II
United States Navy personnel of the Korean War
United States Navy admirals
People from Fort Lauderdale, Florida
Burials at Arlington National Cemetery